Come What May is an American rock band and they primarily play melodic hardcore and melodic metalcore. They are from Athens, Georgia. The band started making music in 2009. The band released a studio album, Strange Dialect, in 2012 with The Cadence Music Group.

Background
Come What May is a hardcore and metal band from Athens, Georgia. Their members are vocalist and guitarist, Joey Hreha, vocalist and keyboardist, Timothy Watts, guitarist, Evan Cerwonka, bassists, Garrett Lennox, and drummer, Patrick Farace.

Music history
The band commenced as a musical entity in May 2009, with their first release, Strange Dialect, a studio album, that was released on June 12, 2012.

Members
Current members
 Joey Hreha - vocals, guitar
 Timothy Watts - vocals, keys
 Evan Cerwonka - guitar
 Garrett Lennox - Vocals, bass
 Patrick Farace - drums

Discography
Studio albums
 Strange Dialect (June 12, 2012)

References

External links
Official website

Musical groups from Georgia (U.S. state)
Musical groups established in 2009